The South Bačka District is one of seven administrative districts of the autonomous province of Vojvodina, Serbia. Geographically it lies in the southern part of Bačka and northern part of Syrmia. According to the 2011 census results, it has a population of 615,371 inhabitants. The administrative center of the district is the city of Novi Sad, which is also the capital and the largest city of the Autonomous Province of Vojvodina.

Administrative history

In the 9th century, the area was ruled by the Bulgarian-Slavic duke Salan. From 11th to 16th century, during the administration of the medieval Kingdom of Hungary, the area was mostly part of the Bacsensis County, with small northern parts of it in the Bodrogiensis County and Csongradiensis County. In 1526-27, the area was ruled by the independent Serb ruler, emperor Jovan Nenad, while during Ottoman administration (16th-17th century), it was part of the Sanjak of Segedin.

During Habsburg administration (18th century), the area was divided between the Bodrog County, Batsch County and the Military Frontier. The two counties were joined into single Batsch-Bodrog County in the 18th century. Since the abolishment of the Theiß-Marosch section of the Military Frontier in 1751, part of that territory was also included into Batsch-Bodrog County. The only part of the area that remained within Military Frontier was Šajkaška region. From 1751 to 1848, northeastern part of the area belonged to the autonomous District of Potisje.

In the 1850s, the area was mostly part of the Novi Sad District, with some northern parts in the Sombor District. After 1860, the area was again included into Batsch-Bodrog County (officially Bács-Bodrog County since 1867). In 1873, the Military Frontier in Šajkaška region was abolished and that area was also included into Bács-Bodrog County.

During the royal Serb-Croat-Slovene (Yugoslav) administration (1918-1941), the area was initially a part of the Novi Sad County (1918-1922). Between 1922-29, it was divided between Bačka Oblast and Belgrade Oblast, while from 1929-41 it was part of the Danube Banovina. During the Hungarian-German Axis occupation (1941-1944), the area was included into Bács-Bodrog County.

Since 1944, the area was part of autonomous Yugoslav Vojvodina (which was part of new socialist Yugoslav Serbia since 1945). The present-day districts of Serbia (including South Bačka District) were defined by the Government of Serbia's Enactment of 29 January 1992.

Municipalities
District is divided into 11 municipalities and City of Novi Sad, which is divided into two urban municipalities:
Srbobran
Bač
Bečej (Hungarian: Óbecse)
Vrbas
Bačka Palanka
Bački Petrovac (Slovak: Báčsky Petrovec)
Žabalj
Titel
Temerin
Beočin
Sremski Karlovci

City of Novi Sad is divided into municipalities of:
Novi Sad
Petrovaradin

Note: for municipalities with Hungarian and Slovak relative or absolute majority names are also given in these languages.

Settlements

There are 76 towns and villages, and 1 city in South Bačka. The largest settlements in the district are:

Demographics

According to the last official census done in 2011, the South Bačka District has 615,371 inhabitants.

Ethnic groups

There are 9 municipal areas with Serbian ethnic majority: City of Novi Sad (79%), Sremski Karlovci (78%), Titel (87%), Žabalj (85%), Beočin (70%), Srbobran (66%), Bačka Palanka (79%), Temerin (68%) and Vrbas (55%).

One municipality in the district has a Slovak majority: Bački Petrovac or Báčsky Petrovec in Slovak (65%), and 2 are mixed: Bač, with relative Serb majority (47%) and Bečej or Óbecse in Hungarian, with relative Hungarian majority (46%).

Culture

The first Serbian primary school was founded in Bečej and Zmajevo in 1703, while the first grammar school was established in Sremski Karlovci in 1791.

Novi Sad is home to the oldest cultural and scientific institution of the Serbian people - the Matica Srpska, which was founded in 1826 in Budapest, and transferred to Novi Sad in 1864. The Serbian National Theatre was founded in Novi Sad in 1861.

Economy
Within the district the following industries prevail: chemical, oil, machines, tools and electrical porcelain, textile, food, and construction industry.

Administration
By the Serbian government's 2006 Regulation of the administrative districts the names of all districts were changed from okrug (district) to upravni okrug (administrative district). District is governed by the prefect (načelnik) who is appointed by the central government. Prefects of the South Bačka District were:
 19?? - 1997: Jovo Ubibarip
 1997 - 12 April 2001: Obrad Milošević
 12 April 2001 - 28 June 2002: Arsen Kurjački (b. 1958)
 28 June 2002 - 29 April 2004: Branko Bjelajac
 29 April 2004 - 3 November 2005: Darko Mandić
 3 November 2005 - 6 July 2007: Svetlana Selaković (b. 1957)
 6 July 2007 – present: Darija Šajin (b. 1973)

See also
 Administrative divisions of Serbia
 Districts of Serbia

References

Note: All official material made by Government of Serbia is public by law. Information was taken from official website.

External links

 

 

Geography of Vojvodina
Districts of Vojvodina